The Miami RedHawks football program is a college football team that represents Miami University in the Mid-American Conference (MAC) in the National Collegiate Athletic Association. The team has had 35 head coaches and 2 interim coaches since it started playing organized football in 1888 and was originally known by the nickname Redskins before changing to RedHawks in 1997. Miami competed independent of conferences at various point in its history, but also held memberships in the Ohio Athletic Conference (1911 − 1927), and Buckeye Conference (1928 − 1938) before joining the MAC in 1947. The RedHawks have played in 1,197 games during their 130 seasons. Nine coaches have led the RedHawks to postseason bowl games: Sid Gillman, Woody Hayes, John Pont, Bill Mallory, Dick Crum, Tim Rose, Terry Hoeppner, Michael Haywood, and Chuck Martin. Fifteen coaches have won conference championships with the RedHawks: three for the OAC, one for the Buckeye, and eleven for the MAC . No Miami coach has led the RedHawks to a national championship. As of the end of the 2019 season, Randy Walker is the all-time leader in games coached (99) and wins (59), while Frank Wilton is the all-time leader years coached (10). C. K. Fauver leads the RedHawks in winning percentage with a perfect 1.000 in his one season at Miami. Among coaches with more than two seasons of tenure, George Little has the highest winning percentage, .875, and Don Treadwell has the lowest winning percentage, with a record of 8-21 (.276) in roughly two and half seasons.

Of the 35 RedHawks coaches, five have been inducted into the College Football Hall of Fame: Little, Gillman, Hayes, Ara Parseghian, and Bo Schembechler.  These men and the number of high-caliber player coaches the school has produced gave rise to its nickname as a "Cradle of Coaches". No coach has received National Coach of the Year honors. On December 3, 2013, Miami hired Martin, who remains the current head coach as of December 2019.

Key

Coaches
Statistics correct as of the end of the 2022 NCAA Division I FBS football season

Notes

References
General

Specific

Lists of college football head coaches

Ohio sports-related lists